Caamaño Passage is a strait on the North Coast of British Columbia, Canada, located between Dundas and Zayas Islands on the west side of Chatham Sound near Prince Rupert.

It was named for Jacinto Caamaño, commander of the Spanish exploration ship Aranzazu which had been on the coast in question in 1792. Captain Frederick C. Learmonth of  who surveyed the Zayas Island officially named the strait Caamaño Passage.

See also 
 Caamaño Sound, another body of water in British Columbia that is named for Jacinto Caamaño

References 

Straits of British Columbia
North Coast of British Columbia
Spanish history in the Pacific Northwest